Out Cold is a 1989 American black comedy film directed by Malcolm Mowbray (who made 1984's A Private Function), and stars Teri Garr, Randy Quaid and John Lithgow.

Plot
The film is set in and around San Pedro, Los Angeles, California - 'the Edward Hopper streets and storefronts create a world where the script plays itself out in all its linear precision.' Sunny (Teri Garr) hires a private detective (Randy Quaid) to trail her husband Ernie (Bruce McGill), whom she believes is lavishing time and money on other women. She wants all the details so she can clean him out in a divorce action. But she is impatient and kills Ernie, taking a chance to make his business partner, Dave (John Lithgow), think he did it. Ernie and Dave worked as butchers in the Army and when they got out they ran a butcher's shop together. Dave has always been in love with Sunny - now he is convinced he has killed Ernie by accidentally locking him in a freezer. Lester Atlas, the private detective, thinks he has pictures of Ernie's lover visiting him at the shop but has actually photographed Sunny on the night she killed him.

Criticism
The film was reviewed, favourably, by the eminent critic Pauline Kael in her final collection of movie reviews, Movie Love. "Teri Garr plays her role with a savage, twinkling joy. Why doesn't her skill get more recognition? This small, disingenuous comedy has been buffed to shine like a jewel; the smoothness of it keeps you giggling."

References

External links

1989 films
1989 comedy films
Films directed by Malcolm Mowbray
Films set in Los Angeles
Films scored by Michel Colombier
American comedy films
1980s English-language films
1980s American films